Max Georg Baumann (20 November 1917, Kronach – 17 July 1999, Berlin) was a German composer.

Biography

He studied conducting, piano, and trombone Berlin Hochschule für Musik with Konrad Friedrich Noetel and Boris Blacher. He spent two years as a choir director and deputy Kapellmeister at the opera in Stralsund (1947-1949). He taught piano and music theory at the Berlin College of Music (1946-1978). In 1960 he was appointed professor. After meeting French organist Jean Guillou during this time, Baumann wrote his first compositions for organ (Invocation op. 67 no. 5, Trois pièces brèves op. 67 no. 6, Psalmi op. 67 no. 2), which Guillou premiered in a concert on January 20, 1963, at St. Matthias church in Berlin. Baumann also appeared as conductor and choirmaster and, in 1963, became interim conductor of the choir at St. Hedwig's Cathedral. His cantata Libertas cruciata was the first composition written specifically with stereo FM radio in mind.

Awards
 1953: Berlin Art Prize.
 1963: Prix Italia for the Dramatic Cantata Libertas cruciata - the first stereophonic work.
 1977: Gold Medal "for special merits" by the district Kronach.
 1977: Golden Orlando di Lasso Medal of general Cecilia Association.
 1986: Commander of St Gregory with Star, appointed by Pope John Paul II.

Works
 Change of Scenes, Op. 83 (1968) for flute and piano
 Coming of the Lord, Op. 66 (1959), Advent cycle for Choir
 Concertino for recorder, guitar, and mandolin orchestra, Op. 38 no. 2
 Concerto for Piano and Orchestra, Op. 36 (1953)
 Concerto for Organ, Strings and Timpani, Op. 70 (1964)
 Duo op. 62 no. 1 (1958) for cello and guitar
 Five Songs, Op. 9 (1947) for baritone and piano
 German Vespers, Op. 64 (1960) for soprano, speaker ad lib., choir, and orchestra
 Invocation, Op. 67 no. 5 (1962) for organ
 Libertas cruciata. Dramatic Cantata, Op. 71 (1963), for soloists, speaker, speech choir, chorus and large orchestra
 Mass: Guardian Angel, Op. 50 (1955) for SATB. Choir (organ ad lib.)
 Octet for Strings, Clarinet, Bassoon and Horn, Op. 72 (1964)
 Orchestral Variations, Op. 29 (1951)
 Pater Noster, Op. 51 (1955) for mixed choir
 Pelléas and Mélisande. Ballet (after Maurice Maeterlinck), Op. 44 (1954)
 Perspectives I, Op. 55 (1957) for large orchestra
 Psalmi, Op. 67 no. 2 (1962) for organ
 Resurrection, Op. 94 (1980) for soprano, baritone, bass, narrators, choir, and orchestra
 Serenata italiana danzante for Plucked Instruments
 Sonata, Op. 8 (1947) for cello and piano
 Sonatina, Op. 13 (1949) for violin and piano
 Sonatina, Op. 74 (1963) for organ
 String Quartet no. 3, Op. 33 (1953)
 Symphony no. 1, Op. 14 (1949)
 Symphony no. 2, Op. 15 (1950)
 Tafelmusik for Plucked Instruments 
 Three Duets, Op. 40 (1953) for two violins
 Three Little Pieces, Op. 35 (c. 1954) for piano
 Trois pièces brèves, Op. 67 no. 6 (1962) for organ

External links
 Max-Baumann-Gesellschaft

References

 Michael Kubik (1999). Nachruf für das BDZ-Mitglied Max Baumann. Zupfmusikmagazin 4: 154.

1917 births
1999 deaths
20th-century German composers
German male composers
20th-century German male musicians